The pont National (named pont Napoléon-III from its construction until 1870) is a road and rail bridge across the Seine in Paris, to the east of the 12th and 13th arrondissements.  With a total length of 188.5m, it is made up of 5 masonry arches.  Its rail part carries the Petite Ceinture, now disused, and its road part links boulevard Poniatowski to boulevard Masséna. Its nearest Paris Métro stations are Porte de Charenton and Cour Saint-Émilion.

History

It was built between 1852 and 1853 as a railway bridge (to allow the Petite Ceinture line to cross the river) and to link the "enceintes" on the two sides of the river.  Its architects were E. Couche, Petit, Gaspard, and Netter.  Its width was doubled with an addition on the upstream side in 1936.

See also
List of crossings of the River Seine

External links

  Mairie de Paris
  Structurae

National
National
Buildings and structures in the 12th arrondissement of Paris
Buildings and structures in the 13th arrondissement of Paris